The 1863 Manila earthquake struck the Philippines on June 3, 1863.

Overview 
The Manila earthquake on June 3, 1863, destroyed Manila Cathedral, the Ayuntamiento (city hall), the Governor's Palace (all three located at the time on Plaza Mayor, now Plaza de Roma) and much of the city. The residence of the governor-general was moved to Malacañang Palace located about 3 km (1.9 miles) up the Pasig River, while the other two buildings were rebuilt in place. Fatalities was 1,000.

Epicenter and effects 
Manila and adjacent provinces. A disastrous earthquake, comparable with that of 1645. Laid in ruins the cathedral and nearly all the other churches, except San Agustin, the palace of the Governor-General, the Audiencia, the barracks, warehouses, etc.; all in all, 46 public buildings in ruins and 25 others badly damaged. Of private houses 570 were destroyed, 531 left tottering. Total, 1,172 buildings in ruins or badly damaged. The number of victims was appalling. It is estimated that in Manila and the surrounding towns alone the number of killed reached 400, that of the injured 2,000. The catastrophe likewise involved many towns in Rizal, Laguna, and Cavite, where it destroyed churches and a great number of houses.

References

See also 
 List of earthquakes in the Philippines

1863 earthquakes
June 1863 events
Earthquakes in the Philippines
1863 in the Philippines
Earthquakes